Aguessac is a commune in the Aveyron department in the Occitanie region of southern France.

The inhabitants of the commune are known as Nagassols or Nagassoles

Geography
Aguessac is just south of the Massif Central and is located some 4 km north of Millau and 20 km south of Severac-le-Chateau. It can be accessed by the D29 road branching off the D911 in the west and continuing into the commune and south to the village. There is also the D809 coming from Millau in the south passing through the village and continuing north to join the A75 autoroute. The D907 goes north-east from the village to Riviere-sur-Tarn and the D167 goes west by a tortuous mountain route to Saint-Germain. The famous Millau Viaduct (Viaduc de la Garrigue) is on the A75 autoroute immediately to the west of the commune. The commune is mixed forest and high country farmland.

There are many streams flowing through the commune: the Ruisseau de Malbose forms the northern border of the commune, the Lumansonesque forms the eastern border flowing into the Tarn which forms the southern part of the eastern border. The Lumansonesque is fed by the Barbade with its numerous tributaries which forms part of the western border before flowing across the commune and joining the Lumansonesque.

Neighbouring communes and villages

Administration
List of Successive Mayors of Aguessac

Mayors from 1926

Population

Distribution of Age Groups
The  population of the commune of Aguessac is younger than average for the department of Aveyron.

Percentage Distribution of Age Groups in Aguessac and Aveyron Department in 2017

Source: INSEE

Economy
The economy of the commune is agricultural and characterized by traditional agriculture based on farming for the production of calves and lambs for fattening. There are twelve farms in this commune.

Sites and monuments
The Chateau of Cabrières

Notable people linked to the commune
Emma Calvé (1858-1942) at the height of her fame bought the Chateau of Cabrières in 1884 before selling it to a manufacturer of gloves a few years later.

See also
Cantons of the Aveyron department

References

External links
Aguessac official website 
Aguessac on the old National Geographic Institute website 
Aguessac on Géoportail, National Geographic Institute (IGN) website 
Aguesac on the 1750 Cassini Map

Communes of Aveyron